Matěj Končal (born 8 December 1993) is a professional Czech football player who currently plays for TJ Přeštice. He has represented the Czech Republic at youth level.

Career
After a spell at German club SV Poppenreuth, Štípek returned to the Czech Republic in February 2021, signing with TJ Přeštice.

References

External links
 
 

1993 births
Living people
Czech footballers
Czech expatriate footballers
Czech Republic youth international footballers
Czech Republic under-21 international footballers
Czech First League players
Czech National Football League players
2. Liga (Slovakia) players
FC Viktoria Plzeň players
FK Varnsdorf players
FK Mladá Boleslav players
1. FK Příbram players
FK Jablonec players
FK Baník Sokolov players
MFK Vítkovice players
KFC Komárno players
Association football forwards
Czech expatriate sportspeople in Slovakia
Czech expatriate sportspeople in Germany
Expatriate footballers in Slovakia
Expatriate footballers in Germany
Sportspeople from Plzeň